The Queen of Sparta (Italian:La regina di Sparta) is a 1931 film directed by Manfred Noa and starring Antonio Moray, Viola LaRosa and Franco Faris. The film was made by the low-budget Itala Film in Hollywood, primarily for release in Italian-speaking inhabitants of the United States. Shot as a silent with sound added later, it re-used footage from Noa's 1924 film Helen of Troy.

Its complex background has led to it being classified variously as an American, German or Italian film.

Cast
 Antonio Moray as Priam  
 Viola LaRosa as Helen  
 Franco Faris as Paris  
 Bernardo Camilli 
 Giuseppe Laroy 
 Carlo Borelli 
 Pietro Costo

References

Bibliography 
 Winkler, Martin M (ed.). Troy: From Homer's Iliad to Hollywood Epic. John Wiley & Sons, 2009.
 Pantelis Michelakis & Maria Wyke. The Ancient World in Silent Cinema''. Cambridge University Press, 2013.

External links 
 

1931 films
1930s Italian-language films
Films directed by Manfred Noa
Italian black-and-white films
Italian drama films
1931 drama films
1930s Italian films